Wahnfried was the name given by Richard Wagner to his villa in Bayreuth.

Financed by King Ludwig II of Bavaria, the house was constructed from 1872 to 1874 under Bayreuth Carl Wölfel's supervision after plans from Berlin architect Wilhelm Neumann, the plans being altered according to some ideas of Wagner. He and his family moved in on 28 April 1874, while the house was still under construction. Engraved across the portal is Wagner's motto:  ("Here where my delusions have found peace, let this place be named Wahnfried"), which initially caused some amusement among local townsfolk.

Wagner did not spend the closing days of his life at Wahnfried, leaving Bayreuth on 6 September 1882 for the sixth and final time for Venice, where he resided until his death 13 February 1883 at the Palazzo Vendramin-Calergi. Wagner's body was repatriated to Wahnfried in a public procession through Bayreuth on 18 February, and his grave lies next to that of his wife, Cosima on its grounds.

Leading up to and during World War II, the Bayreuth Festspielhaus and Wahnfried were frequently visited by Adolf Hitler, himself an avid admirer of Wagner, but in 1945 the living room with its rotunda and the guest room located on the side and rear of the house were destroyed by allied bombing, along with two-thirds of the rest of Bayreuth. Books, paintings and archives had been secured beforehand in the basement of the Winifred Wagner Hospital, however a Gestapo official stopped Winifred from removing historic furnishings such as Wagner's writing desk, accusing her of "defeatism". As a result, these were later destroyed in the bombing.

From 1949, after expropriation was lifted on the Festspielhaus, Richard Wagner's grandson Wieland Wagner, with his wife and their four children, returned to live in the habitable part of the hastily repaired Wahnfried, while Winifred lived at her late husband, Siegfried Wagner's house next door. Upon Wieland's death in 1966, Wahnfried ceased to be a dwelling, after Wieland's brother, Wolfgang Wagner, had the house measured and asked his widow, Gertrud (née Reissinger), to pay rent, thereby forcing her to move out with her children. From 1953, Wolfgang had been settled in a house built on the edge of the Festpielhaus, with Winifred remaining in Siegfried's house until her death in 1980.

In 1973, Wolfgang and Winifred gifted Wahnfried to the city of Bayreuth. Over the next three years, the war- and weather-damaged parts of the house were restored to their original state with the recreation of the rotunda, salon and guest room, so that the official inauguration of the Richard Wagner Museum in Bayreuth was able to go ahead as planned on July 24, 1976.

A stylized version of Villa Wahnfried was used for the sets of Stefan Herheim's new production of Parsifal at the Bayreuth Festival in 2008.

The house was closed again in 2010 for extensive restoration and renovation at a cost of 20 million Euros. On 26 July 2015, there was a grand re-opening of the villa, with archive rooms and a new pavilion.

Along with the Bayreuth Festspielhaus, Wahnfried has become a shrine for admirers of Wagner. Visitors can take a walk in the remote , the baroque park of Bayreuth's New Castle, to where a path directly leads.

Gallery

See also 
 List of music museums

 Wahnfried (film)

Citations and references

External links 

 Official site:  Richard Wagner Museum Bayreuth
 :de:Winifred Wagner und die Geschichte des Hauses Wahnfried 1914–1975
 Richard Wagner's Grave
 'Wagner & Me (Stephen Fry)' (YouTube)
 

Richard Wagner
Buildings and structures in Bayreuth
Houses completed in 1874
Museums established in 1976
Villas in Germany